NGC 502, also occasionally referred to as PGC 5034 or UGC 922, is a lenticular galaxy in the constellation Pisces. It is located approximately 113 million light-years from the Solar System and was discovered on 25 September 1862 by German astronomer Heinrich Louis d'Arrest.
When the Morphological Catalogue of Galaxies was published between 1962 and 1974, the identifications of NGC 502 and NGC 505 were reversed. In reality, NGC 502 is equal to MGC +01-04-041 and not MCG +01-04-043 as noted in the catalogue.

Observation history 
Arrest discovered NGC 502 using an 11" reflecting telescope in Copenhagen. His position, which he measured on four separate nights, matches with both UGC 922 and PGC 5034. John Louis Emil Dreyer, creator of the New General Catalogue, described the galaxy as "considerably bright, small, round, brighter middle and nucleus".

See also 
 Elliptical galaxy 
 List of NGC objects (1–1000)
 Pisces (constellation)

References

External links 

 
 SEDS

Lenticular galaxies
Pisces (constellation)
0502
00922
+01-04-041
005034
J01225553+0902570
Astronomical objects discovered in 1862
Discoveries by Heinrich Louis d'Arrest